Trichothyrinula is a genus of fungi in the Microthyriaceae family.

Species
As accepted by Species Fungorum;
 Trichothyrinula petrakii 
 Trichothyrinula sydowii

References

External links
Index Fungorum

Microthyriales